The 2001 Qatar Total Fina Elf Open was a tennis tournament played on outdoor hard courts at the Khalifa International Tennis Complex in Doha in Qatar and was part of Tier III of the 2001 WTA Tour. The tournament was held from 12 February through 18 February 2001. First-seeded Martina Hingis won the singles title.

Finals

Singles

 Martina Hingis defeated  Sandrine Testud 6–3, 6–2
 It was Hingis' 2nd title of the year and the 69th of her career.

Doubles

 Sandrine Testud /  Roberta Vinci defeated  Kristie Boogert /  Miriam Oremans 7–5, 7–6(7–4)
 It was Testud's 1st title of the year and the 6th of her career. It was Vinci's only title of the year and the 1st of her career.

External links
 WTA tournament edition details

Qatar Total Fina Elf Open
Qatar Ladies Open
Qatar Total Fina Elf Open 
Qatar Total Fina Elf Open